The Seoul Music Awards (SMA) is a major South Korean music awards show presented by the newspaper Sports Seoul. The award winners are selected based on a combination of criteria, including music sales, popular votes, and expert judges' opinions.

The annual ceremony was first held in 1990, when the Grand Prize was awarded to singer Byun Jin-sub. Boy group BTS is the most-awarded artist, having won 26 awards; they are also tied with Exo for the most Grand Prizes won, with four each.

Ceremonies

Categories 

 The Grand Prize (also known as the Daesang) is typically awarded to one musical act, with the exception of the 9th awards ceremony, when the Grand Prize was shared by H.O.T. and Sechs Kies, and the 10th awards ceremony, when it was shared by Jo Sung-mo and Fin.K.L. Additionally, at the 29th awards ceremony, two Grand Prizes were awarded: the Album Daesang, which went to BTS, and the Digital Daesang, which went to Taeyeon.
Main Prizes (also known as Bonsang) are given to several musical acts.
The winner of the Popularity Award is determined by domestic viewers' votes, while the winner of the K-Wave Special Award is determined by overseas viewers' votes.

Grand Prize (Daesang)

Main Prize (Bonsang)
The list of winners are listed in alphanumeric order.

New Artist Award

Best Album

Best Song

Genre-specific awards

R&B Hip-Hop Award

Ballad Award

Trot Award

Dance Performance Award

Original Soundtrack Award

Band Award

Popularity Award

K-wave Special Award

Discovery of the Year Award

Special awards

Discontinued awards

Rock Award

Folk Award

Music Video Award

Show & Culture Award

Non-performer awards

Directing Award

Producer Award

Composition Award

Lyricist Award

Arrangement Award

Planning Award

Stylist Award

Most wins 
The following artist(s) arranged in alphanumeric order has received five or more awards:

Notes

References 
 Seoul Music Awards official website
 Complete list of winners (1990–2020)

 Other references

External links 
  

Seoul Music Awards
South Korean music awards
Awards established in 1990
1990 establishments in South Korea
Annual events in South Korea